Stigmella ruficapitella is a moth of the family Nepticulidae. It is found in northern and central Europe. It is mostly absent in the Mediterranean region, with the exception
of Mount Olympus in Greece and Trieste. It has recently been recorded from Russia and Bosnia.

The wingspan is 4.5–6 mm. The thick erect hairs on the head vertex are black in the male, orange yellow in the female and the collar is black in both sexes Antennal eyecaps are yellow- white. The front wings are dark bronze brown with a weak metallic luster. Hindwings are grey.

Adults are on wing from May to June and from July to August. There are two generations per year.

The larvae feed on Quercus cerris, Quercus petraea, Quercus pubescens and Quercus robur. They mine the leaves of their host plant. The mine initially consists of a narrow corridor with a thin frass line, soon widening into a fairly long, broad corridor with a largely broad frass line. Mostly, the first part of the mine follows the leaf margin, entering the centre of the leaf after a sharp turn.

External links
bladmineerders.nl
UKmoths
Fauna Europaea
Stigmella ruficapitella images at  Consortium for the Barcode of Life
The Quercus Feeding Stigmella Species Of The West Palaearctic: New Species, Key And Distribution (Lepidoptera: Nepticulidae)
Swedish moths

Nepticulidae
Moths of Europe
Moths described in 1828